Sir Thomas Barnardiston, 2nd Baronet (c. 1646 – 7 October 1698) was an English nobleman and Whig politician.

Life
Barnardiston was the son of Sir Thomas Barnardiston, 1st Baronet and Anne Airmine, daughter of Sir William Airmine, 1st Baronet. He was admitted to Gray's Inn on 19 June 1667. He succeeded to his father's title on 4 October 1669.

Between 1685 and 1690 Barnardiston served as the Member of Parliament for Great Grimsby in the House of Commons of England. From 1690 to 1698 he was the MP for Sudbury.

He married Elizabeth King, the daughter of Sir Robert King of Boyle Abbey, Roscommon, in the Kingdom of Ireland and his second wife Sophia Zouch, daughter of Sir Edward Zouch and Dorothea Silking. They had four sons, three of whom later inherited their father's baronetcy.

References

1640s births
1698 deaths
Baronets in the Baronetage of England
Members of Gray's Inn
Members of the Parliament of England for Great Grimsby
English MPs 1685–1687
English MPs 1689–1690
English MPs 1690–1695
English MPs 1695–1698
Thomas
Year of birth uncertain
Whig (British political party) MPs for English constituencies